Legal scholars and practitioners generally discuss laws that affect housing within the context of real property, landlord–tenant law, mortgage law, laws that forbid housing discrimination, laws that attempt to preserve affordable housing, etc.

The following is a list of housing-related statutes:

Canada

New Zealand

United Kingdom

United States

Local

Note: This section is proposed to be deleted per talk page discussion.

Home Equity Theft Prevention Act, a New York State law passed in  2006, to provide homeowners with information about the homeowner’s property, particularly when homeowners are in default on their mortgage payments

housing statutes
housing statutes